Bahuarwa is a village in West Champaran district in the Indian state of Bihar.

Demographics
 India census, Bahuarwa had a population of 1457 in 344 households. Males constitute 52.84% of the population and females 47.15%. Bahuarwa has an average literacy rate of 50.37%, lower than the national average of 74%: male literacy is 40.38%, and female literacy is 59.61%. In Bahuarwa, 22.23% of the population is under 6 years of age.

References

Villages in West Champaran district